Louis Marie Charles Hurault de Sorbée (born 17 April 1786, Reims) was a French soldier.  He fought at the Battle of Waterloo and the French capture of Algiers and was made a colonel of his regiment in the wake of the July Revolution.

Sources
 

1786 births
Military personnel from Reims
French generals
1850 deaths
Knights of the Order of Saint Louis
Commandeurs of the Légion d'honneur